Geoffrey Smith may refer to:

Geoffrey C. Smith (politician), member of the Ohio House of Representatives, 1999–2006
Geoffrey C. Smith (sculptor) (born 1961), American sculptor and photographer
Geoffrey Johnson-Smith (1924–2010), Conservative politician in the United Kingdom
Geoffrey L. Smith (born 1955), scientist specialising in vaccinia virus poxvirus research
Geoffrey Smith (admiral) (born 1950), Australian Deputy Chief of Navy, 1999–2000
Geoffrey Smith (filmmaker), maker of documentaries including The English Surgeon and Presumed Guilty
Geoffrey Smith (gardener) (1928–2009), English gardener, author, broadcaster
Geoffrey Smith (radio presenter) (born 1943), British based American radio presenter and writer
Geoffrey Smith (rugby league), rugby league footballer of the 1960s for Great Britain and for York
Geoffrey Smith (bishop), Anglican Archbishop of Adelaide from 2017

See also
Geoff Smith (disambiguation)
Jeff Smith (disambiguation)